is a train station located in Yanagawa, Fukuoka.

Lines 
Nishi-Nippon Railroad
Tenjin Ōmuta Line

Platforms

Adjacent stations

Surrounding area
 Yanagawa Driving School
 Yanagawa Police Station
 Tamatare Shrine
 7-Eleven Tokumasu store
 Japan National Route 208
 Prefectural Route 772

Railway stations in Fukuoka Prefecture
Railway stations in Japan opened in 1938